= Ancient Chinese =

Ancient Chinese may refer to:

- The people—particularly Han people—of ancient China
- Old Chinese or Archaic Chinese, the ancient form of spoken Chinese
- Classical Chinese or Literary Chinese, the form now known as "Ancient Chinese" in China
- Middle Chinese, the form employed by the Tang poets and often known as "Ancient Chinese" in older English texts
